Castlecoote(otherwise known in ) is a townland within the civil parish of Fuerty on the R366 regional road near the town of Roscommon in County Roscommon, Ireland. Castlecoote is known for Castlecoote house and the ruins of a much older castle. The River Suck, which encircles Castlecoote House, is renowned for its trout and coarse fishing.

History 
Castlecoote's English name is derived from 'Coote', literally translated meaning 'Coote's Castle', in which Sir Charles Coote, 'President of Connaught' during the rebellion of 1641 lived. Castlecoote is a primarily agricultural village.

Castlecoote House 
The present Castlecoote house was built on the site of an earlier medieval castle, believed to have been built between 1570 and 1616. The castle was based at a strategic side and it is suggested that it was the base of the Chieftains of Fuerty, the MacGeraghty clan. In 1616 it was in the possession of Sir Charles Coote, who refortified and improved the castle. It was attacked thrice by the confederate forces in the 1640s.

The present house was constructed later and was built within the enclosure of the now ruinous old castle. In the basement tower rooms, the musket chambers overlook the entrance steps. In the 18th century the property was under the ownership of the Gunnings. The two famous Gunning sisters, renowned for their beauty lived here. In the 20th century the house was occupied by a well-known equestrian, Henry D. Strevens. The present owner, restored the property after purchasing it in 1997.

Culture 
The town is situated in the Roman Catholic Diocese of Elphin and is served by a church in the village. There are several pubs in the vicinity as well as the Castlecoote stores and a disused stone mill. The village has been awarded a category A gold medal at the 2019 Tidy Towns competition.

See also 

 List of townlands of County Roscommon
 List of towns and villages in Ireland
 Cromwellian conquest of Ireland

References

External links 

 logainm.ie-Castlecoote
 Folklore material related to this place is available in The Schools’ Collection (1937-1939) »

Further reading
Gantz, Ida. The Pastel Portrait. The Gunnings of CastleCoote and Howards of Hampstead. /Cresset press 1963
https://books.google.co.uk/books?id=BHxUiwt9a7gC&q=Castlecoote&dq=Castlecoote&hl=en&sa=X&ved=2ahUKEwjqtoDy69DsAhWHTRUIHVDYCO04ChDoATAIegQIARAC
https://books.google.co.uk/books?id=aKdIAQAAMAAJ&q=Castlecoote&dq=Castlecoote&hl=en&sa=X&ved=2ahUKEwjqtoDy69DsAhWHTRUIHVDYCO04ChDoATAFegQIAxAC

Townlands of County Roscommon
Castles in County Roscommon